Rodney Winston Breedlove (March 10, 1938 – May 25, 2021) was an American professional  football who was a linebacker for eight seasons in the National Football League (NFL) with the Washington Redskins and the Pittsburgh Steelers from 1960 to 1967. Breedlove was a one-time Pro Bowler in 1962.

Breedlove received an All-American honorable mention in 1957–59, AP All-ACC selection in 1957 and 1958, and All-ACC First-team selection in 1957 as a Maryland Terrapins guard.

References

1938 births
2021 deaths
Maryland Terrapins football players
Washington Redskins players
Pittsburgh Steelers players
Eastern Conference Pro Bowl players
Sportspeople from Cumberland, Maryland
Sports in Cumberland, Maryland